Wissel is a hamlet in the Dutch province of Gelderland. It is located in the municipality of Epe, about 2 km west of the town of Epe.

It was first mentioned in 1273 as de Wischele. The etymology is not clear. It is not a statistical entity, and the postal authorities have placed it under Epe. In 1840, it was home to 468 people.

In 1967, a miniature zoo opened in Wissel called . It specialised in small animals. It closed in 2015, and the animals have been relocated to other zoos.

References

Populated places in Gelderland
Epe